The Sioux City Bandits are a professional indoor football team based in Sioux City, Iowa, and compete as a member of Champions Indoor Football (CIF). The team was founded in 1999 as the Sioux City Attack. In 2001, the team assumed their current name of the Bandits. The Bandits joined the CIF as result of a merger in 2014. The Bandits play their home games at the Tyson Events Center.

History
In 2000, the Sioux City Attack joined the original Indoor Football League. After this season concluded, the Orlando Predators of the Arena Football League bought out all but two of the league's teams. Once they were founded, the Sioux City Bandits assumed identity of the Attack. The organization has seen seven different leagues as the Attack played in the previously mentioned original IFL. The Bandits have played in the National Indoor Football League (NIFL), United Indoor Football (UIF), the new Indoor Football League (IFL), American Professional Football League (APFL), the Champions Professional Indoor Football League (CPIFL), and now Champions Indoor Football (CIF). Notable team feats include the signing of former Sioux City running back Fred Jackson by the Buffalo Bills of the NFL. Jackson, out of Coe College, was the 2005 United Indoor Football's league leading rusher in which he set an Indoor Football record for most yards in a single season with more than 1,700. That year the Bandits hosted the championship game facing their bitter rival Sioux Falls Storm. Sioux City had beaten Sioux Falls three times during the regular season but ended up losing the championship game, 40–38.

After the 2021 season, Don Belson came on as the minority co-owner of the team. Belson has been associated with the team for nearly 20 years working in Game Day Operations.

Notable games

Players

Current roster

Bandits Ring of Honor

Season-by-season

Head coaches

References

External links
 
 All-Time stats

1999 establishments in Iowa